Night Shades is the fourth and final studio album by Cobra Starship, being released through Fueled by Ramen and Decaydance

Records on August 29, 2011. The album is the follow-up to 2009's Hot Mess. The first single from the album, "You Make Me Feel...", features singer Sabi and was released on May 10, 2011. A music video has been created for it. The full album was made available to stream for free on their Facebook page prior to its release.

The album debuted at number 50 on the Billboard 200 with 9,000 sales in its first week, but plummeted to number 185 in its second week. Cobra Starship played pre-show on MTV's 2011 Video Music Awards and following their performance, their single "You Make Me Feel..." reached the top 10 of the US Billboard Hot 100 to become their second top 10 hit at number seven. The band was the opening act for Justin Bieber in October through South America. The third single "#1Night" has sold more than 91,000 downloads to date 2013.

Background
The group's third album, Hot Mess, released in 2009 by Decaydance/Fueled by Ramen, debuted at number four on the Billboard 200. It was powered by the smash lead single, "Good Girls Go Bad", which featured Gossip Girl actress Leighton Meester and peaked at number seven on the Billboard Hot 100 with more than 2 million copies sold, according to Nielsen SoundScan. After the success, Cobra Starship frontman Gabe Saporta said of the aftermath of Hot Mess: "That caused me to lose my girlfriend, who I had been with since before Cobra started."

The band started writing Night Shades in September 2010, but during these initial sessions, Saporta wasn't happy with what they were creating. "We had a lot of songs that just felt uninspired to me," he stated. "It felt like I was just doing it to do it, because that's what we do, we're a band." He confessed that his solution for inspiration was embarking on what he describes as a "spiritual detox" in South America. "I went on this, like, pretty crazy... I don't know if you call it a retreat, but I lived in a little house in the forest in Brazil, and all I ate was rice for 10 days."

In the end, the trip gave Saporta "clarity" and made him feel "rejuvenated"—two things he needed to survive the studio mishaps Cobra Starship experienced after he returned. First, the band set up shop in an abandoned floor of a building owned by a friend's family—but two weeks into recording, they were unexpectedly met by a demolition crew. Their next attempt at setting up studio space unwittingly ended up being adjacent to a place rented by a masseuse. Finally, the band found a home in a converted storage space on the ground floor of Saporta's building.

Once the band settled into their permanent digs, Saporta started delving into the issues he started dissecting in South America—and found a way to address them from a unique perspective. "When I was writing in September, the problem was [that] it was either uninspired or it was really depressing," he explains. "It was about the fact that I lost the love of my life. As much as I need to deal with that, I don't think the whole world needs to deal with that. It's very self-serving just for me to make a record for that. If I would have just written that without taking my spiritual detox in the jungle, we would have had a record that would've just been that."

Speaking of Night Shades, Saporta commented, "This record might be the most commercial record, but also our most honest." Fueled by Ramen president John Janick was quoted as saying, "[Cobra Starship] delivered an album that has the Cobra sound but delivers those radio records" and thought that "there are multiple singles on [the] album."

During an interview with Alicia Fiorletta from The Aquarium, Alex Suarez commented about the album:
"I think we've massaged our writing process a whole lot more. Basically, we started writing this album a long time ago. Ryland and myself would get together to make some songs, then we'd pass it off to Gabe and then he would work on some lyrical concepts and then we would demo it. So we get a huge barrel of songs put together and then he picks the best ones to write off of until it just dwindles down. This time around, we got our own studio space, basically. Ryland and I would go in and produce the final tracks during the day and Gabe would go in at night and track vocals, so we'd sort of tag-team them. Then we also would use our own little home studio set up and do a lot of the production stuff there."

Music and production

Saporta and the band worked with multiple producers; he confirmed Kara DioGuardi (who co-produced the band's 2009 hit "Good Girls Go Bad") and OneRepublic's Ryan Tedder have been collaborators. As for current inspirations, Saporta cites the "attitude toward making music" displayed by the kaleidoscopic electronic duo Major Lazer.

The 11-song set ranges from club anthems like "#1Nite" to the reggae-tinted "Fool Like Me" and slow jam "Anything for Love".

The dance music songs, "You Make Me Feel..." and "Don't Blame the World, It's the DJ's Fault" preserve the band's carefree atmosphere, but show marked production (and sonic) growth. "Stylistically, I think that we're definitely a band that's about making people have a good time, and we definitely want it to feel like a party," Saporta says. "But we also want to experiment with those sounds and make sure that it stays fresh, too." "Fool Like Me" has a slower rhythm, electronic keyboard sounds, story-telling lyrics, and high-pitched accompaniment from The Plastiscines. "Anything for Love" is a heavily synthesized nod to 1980s new wave. Other songs on the album include "Disaster Boy" which offers a flashback to Hot Mess with its more alternative sounds and female vocals; "Don't Blame the World, It's the DJ's Fault" sounds similar to "Fool Like Me" with its slower rhythm; and "You Belong to Me", the upbeat ballad of the album.

Promotional singles
For Night Shades the band engaged in a staged rollout, offering fans sneak peeks of the album through pre-release tracks or promotional singles starting with "#1Nite (One Night)" on July 26, "Fool Like Me" (featuring Plastiscines) on August 9 and "Middle Finger" (featuring Mac Miller) on August 23, available exclusively through iTunes, where fans were able to collect them with the option to complete the album on release date for the remainder of the album price. "Don't Blame the World, It's the DJ's Fault" was released separately onto iTunes on August 29, 2011, the day of Night Shadess release. "Middle Finger" later became the second official single. "#1Nite" featuring My Name Is Kay was released as the third official single in 2012.

Critical reception

Night Shades received generally favorable reviews from most music critics. At Metacritic, which assigns a normalized rating out of 100 to reviews from mainstream critics, the album received an average score of 63, based on 4 reviews. Tim Sendra from AllMusic gave to the album 3.5 out of 5 stars, declaring that "packing so many WTFs into one ten-song record is hardly fair, a bit reckless, and ultimately (amazingly) successful." He also wrote that the album "is ridiculously fun and light, sure to spawn at least a couple of songs you’ll want to play at ironic dance parties, summer blowouts, and maybe even over headphones when you need some (mostly) mindless cheering up. What more could you want from Pop music?." Megan Rozell from Blogcritics was positive, stating that the album "transforms Cobra Starship from an alternative band to a work-in-progress pop sensation," while declaring that the album "is worth the listen."

Mikael Wood from Entertainment Weekly wrote that "the hooks here are undeniably sharp, but Cobra were more fun as party crashers than they are as VIPs." Kirk Miller from Metromix wrote that "the record is full of Auto-Tune, club beats, some '80s retro-pop, guest stars galore, and a sinking feeling that the entire process was hatched by someone's marketing department." Aubrey Welbers from Alternative Press wrote a mixed review, stating that the album "is a meticulously orchestrated dance record", and that "Cobra Starship have misplaced their unique tongue-in-cheek sensibilities; it feels like they’re killing time with safe, indistinguishable club tracks and pop ballads."

Track listing

PersonnelCobra Starship Gabe Saporta – lead vocals
 Ryland Blackinton – guitar, backing vocals and synthesizer
 Alex Suarez – bass, synthesizer and backing vocals
 Nate Novarro – drums
 Victoria Asher – keytar and vocalsAdditional musicians'
 Sabi – "You Make Me Feel..."
 Ryan Tedder – "#1Nite (One Night)"
 Plastiscines – "Fool Like Me"
 Mac Miller – "Middle Finger"
 Jump Into the Gospel – "Schwick"

References

2011 albums
Cobra Starship albums
Albums produced by Ryan Tedder
Albums produced by Stargate
Fueled by Ramen albums